The Woman's Temperance Publishing Association (WTPA) was a non-commercial publisher of temperance literature.  Established in 1879 in Indianapolis, Indiana during the national convention of the Woman's Christian Temperance Union (WCTU), it was a concept of Matilda Carse, an Irish-born American businesswoman, social reformer and leader of the temperance movement.

The WTPA was designed as a joint-stock company and operated in Illinois.  No man could own its stock, as it could only be sold to WCTU women. It began with $5,000 of capital stock, which increased to $125,000. The Board of Directors consisted of seven women, including Carse. The WTPA was dissolved in 1903.

Newspaper
At the first convention of the WCTU, the need of an official organ was recognized, and Abby Fisher Leavitt, of Cincinnati, moved the appointment of a committee "to consider the question of publishing a paper". The following June, the first number of the paper, called the Woman's Temperance Union, was issued, its first editor being Jennie Fowler Willing, of Illinois, and its publisher Mary Coffin Johnson, of New York. At an executive meeting held at the close of the Newark Convention in 1876, a publishing committee was appointed: Mary Towne Burt, New York; Jane M. Geddes, Michigan; Frances E. Willard, Illinois; Esther Pugh, Ohio; Harriet Maria Haven, Vermont; Zerelda G. Wallace, Indiana, and Caroline Brown Buell, Connecticut. Burt, Willard and Buell were made a quorum for the transaction of business. The quorum at once changed the name to Our Union, made Burt publisher, and Margaret Elizabeth Winslow, of Brooklyn, editor. In 1882, at the Louisville Convention, the paper was combined with the Illinois Signal under the name, Our Union Signal, and became the property of the Woman's Temperance Publication Association, which, although separately incorporated, was the publishing house of the National W. C. T. U.

The weekly newspaper was named The Signal and its first issue appeared January 4, 1880; it was 16 pages in size. The first editor was Mary Willard, mother of Frances Willard, the second president of the WCTU. At the end of the first year, there were 3,200 subscriptions.  Eventually, readership reached over 90,000 subscribers. It employed 135 people.  "Thou hast given a banner to them that fear thee, that it may be displayed because of the truth" was the newspaper's motto. In 1882, The Signal merged with Our Union of New York to become The Union Signal.

Other publications
In addition to the newspaper, the WTPA published article reprints called "Timely Talks".  After consolidating its "Illinois Workers' Leaflets", "National Leaflets" covered instruction in departmental work. The Oak and Ivy Leaf was written for young women, The Young Crusader was for children, and there were also several books. The Band of Hope Lesson Manual was published as a quarterly.

Notable people
 Katharine Lente Stevenson (1853–1919), temperance reformer, missionary, editor
 Margaret Ashmore Sudduth (1859–1957), American educator, editor, temperance advocate

References

Attribution

Bibliography

Publishing companies established in 1879
Publishing companies disestablished in 1903
Defunct organizations based in Illinois
Defunct organizations based in Indiana
History of women in Indiana
History of women in Illinois
Christian women's organizations
History of Indianapolis
Publishing companies of the United States
Temperance organizations in the United States
1879 establishments in Indiana
1903 disestablishments in Illinois